Ards (named after the Ards Peninsula) was a local government district in Northern Ireland with the status of borough. It was one of twenty-six districts formed on 1 October 1973, and had its headquarters in Newtownards. It was merged with neighbouring North Down on 1 May 2015 to form the new Borough of Ards and North Down. Other towns in the defunct Borough included Portaferry, Comber, and Donaghadee, and the population of the area was 78,078 according to the 2011 census.

Strangford Lough is at the heart of the area, and is the largest inlet in Ireland with internationally renowned wildlife. The Irish Sea coast stretches from Donaghadee to Portaferry. Mount Stewart, a National Trust property on the shore of Strangford Lough, is in the area, as well as Northern Ireland's only aquarium, Exploris, in Portaferry and Grace Neill's pub in Donaghadee.

Borough council
The borough was governed by Ards Borough Council (Ulster-Scots: Burgh Cooncil o' the Airds, Newton an' Blathewick). The borough was divided into four district electoral areas: Newtownards, Ards West, Ards East and Ards Peninsula, from which 23 members were elected. As of February 2011 the following parties were represented on the council: 11 Democratic Unionist Party (DUP), 6 Ulster Unionist Party (UUP), 4 Alliance Party, and 1 Social Democratic and Labour Party (SDLP), and there was 1 Independent councillor. The next election was due to take place in May 2009, but on 25 April 2008, Shaun Woodward, Secretary of State for Northern Ireland announced that the scheduled 2009 district council elections were to be postponed until the introduction of the eleven new councils in 2011. The proposed reforms were abandoned in 2010, and district council elections took place in 2011

Mayor of Ards
On creation in 1973 Ards District Council adopted the charter of incorporation of the municipal borough of Newtownards, to become Ards Borough Council. The charter also granted the chairman of the council the title "Mayor of Ards".

2013 Stephen McIlveen 
Democratic Unionist Party

Source: Freedom of Information request to Ards Borough Council

Parliamentary and assembly representation

In elections for the Westminster Parliament and Northern Ireland Assembly most of the borough was included in the Strangford constituency, with part (Donaghadee North, Donaghadee South and Millisle) in the North Down constituency.

Town twinning
The borough of Ards had a sister city (twinning) relationship with the city of Peoria, Arizona, USA. As a result of this relationship, regular exchange visits were made between the two communities by artists, educators, business, political and community leaders.

See also
Local Councils in Northern Ireland

References

External links
Ards Borough Council
Armagh & Down Tourism

Politics of County Down
Newtownards
Districts of Northern Ireland, 1972–2015
Boroughs of Northern Ireland